The Galway–Tipperary fixture is a traditional hurling rivalry dating back to 1888. Tipperary have traditionally been one of the strongest teams in the Munster Championship while Galway have won five All-Ireland Senior hurling titles, including defeating Tipperary in the 1988 All-Ireland Hurling Final. There is no present Connacht Championship, so since 2009 Galway have played in the Leinster Senior Hurling Championship.

History
This Tipperary and Galway rivalry started very late on due to Galway not performing in the Senior championship. The rivalry kicked into gear in the 1980s, when Galway came to force. In 1980, when Galway won their first All Ireland title since 1923, Tipperary were still in the Senior hurling doldrums. The two counties had done battle a few times, but from 1887 till 1986, Galway had only won one encounter. But in the 80's, Galway took control. These battles at the time (87-93) were ferocious. Even Present managers Cyril Farrell (Galway) and Michael 'Babs' Keating (Tipperary) got involved. Between 1959 and 1969, Galway played in the Munster Senior Hurling Championship. Seeing as there was no credible Hurling team in Connacht, Galway automatically entered the All-Ireland Semi-final or into the first round of the Qualifiers after that system was introduced. Galway now play in Leinster for a three-year trial period. These teams met each other in the first ever All-Ireland Senior hurling final in 1887 (though played in 1888).	
 
In 2010, a stoppage time winner from Lar Corbett gave Tipperary a one point victory in an All-Ireland quarter-final at Croke Park, with Tipperary going on to win the All-Ireland title.	

In 2014, the sides played each other in the first round of the qualifiers at Semple Stadium on 5 July.	
With 19 minutes remaining Galway had a six point lead but Tipperary went on to outscore Galway by 2-10 to 0-1 in the remainder of the match to win on a 3-25 to 4-13 scoreline.

On 16 August 2015 the two sides met in the semi-final of the 2015 All-Ireland Championship at Croke Park. Galway won the game by one point with an injury time score coming from Shane Moloney at the hill 16 end.	
The teams were level on 10 occasions and in the second half the lead changed hands six times.	
Séamus Callanan scored 3-9 (3-4 from play) to win the man of the match award but ended up on the losing team. It was Eamon O'Shea's last game as Tipperary manager as he was stepping down at the conclusion of the 2015 Championship.	

On 14 August 2016 the two sides met for the third year in a row in the semi-final of the 2016 All-Ireland Senior Hurling Championship at Croke Park. Galway had a 1-10 to 0-11 point lead at half time, but two second half goals for Tipperary in the last ten minutes from substitute John O'Dwyer and John McGrath put Tipperary into a three-point lead. Galway reduced the lead down to one point but Tipperary held on to reach the final which they went on to win.

In 2017, in the All-Ireland semi-final on 6 August, Joe Canning scored an injury time winning point from the right sideline against defending champions Tipperary as Galway won by a point and qualified for the 2017 All-Ireland Senior Hurling Championship Final.

In November 2020, the two teams met in the quarter-finals of the 2020 All-Ireland Senior Hurling Championship with no supporters present due to the COVID-19 pandemic. Galway won the game by 3-23 to 2-14 with a late goal by Aidan Harte putting them in front by a point in the 66th minute where they held on to win by two points.

Statistics
Totals for Galway includes 25 Connacht Senior Hurling Championship's and 2 Leinster Senior Hurling Championship's.

All time results

Legend

Senior

Intermediate

Junior

Under-21

Minor

See also
Galway GAA
Tipperary GAA
Connacht Senior Hurling Championship
Munster Senior Hurling Championship
All-Ireland Senior Hurling Championship

References

Tipperary
Tipperary county hurling team rivalries